The 2001 All Japan Grand Touring Car Championship was the ninth season of Japan Automobile Federation GT premiere racing. It was marked as well as the nineteenth season of a JAF-sanctioned sports car racing championship dating back to the All Japan Sports Prototype Championship. The GT500 class drivers' champions of 2001 were Yuji Tachikawa and Hironori Takeuchi, who had not won a single race during the season driving the No. 38 au Cerumo Toyota Supra, while Nismo won the teams' championship. In the GT300 category, the class champions were the No. 81 Advan Team Daishin Nissan Silvia driven by Takayuki Aoki and Noboyuki Oyagi.

This season marked the final competitive race victory for the McLaren F1 GTR, when Team Take One won the CP Mine GT Race.

Drivers and teams

GT500

Schedule

Season results

Standings

GT500 class

Drivers' standings
Scoring system

Teams' standings
For teams that entered multiple cars, only the best result from each round counted towards the teams' championship.

GT300 class

Drivers

References

External links
 Super GT/JGTC official race archive 

Super GT seasons
JGTC